The Winner's Circle (French: Premières armes) is a 1950 French drama film directed by René Wheeler and starring Michèle Alfa, Julien Carette and Paul Frankeur.

The film takes place in a stable for aspiring young jockeys.

Cast
 Michèle Alfa as Yvonne  
 Julien Carette as Simon  
 Guy Decomble as Émile  
 Paul Frankeur as Victor  
 Serge Grave as Michel  
 Henri Poupon as Le père Lelarge  
 Roger Rafal as Barrymore  
 Santa Relli as Lucienne  
 Jean Cordier as René  
 Palmyre Levasseur as La concierge 
 Suzanne Maury as La duchesse 
 Albert Plantier as Josito  
 Serge Soltani as Bobo

References

Bibliography 
 Crisp, C.G. The Classic French Cinema, 1930-1960. Indiana University Press, 1993.

External links 
 

1950 films
1950 drama films
French drama films
1950s French-language films
Films directed by René Wheeler
French horse racing films
French black-and-white films
1950s French films